Walter Eugene Guess (December 30, 1932 – March 13, 1975) was an American lawyer and politician.

Born in Tutwiler, Mississippi, Guess graduated from George Washington High School in Alexandria, Virginia. In 1955, Guess graduated from the College of William & Mary. He served in the United States Army as an artillery officer at Fort Sill, Oklahoma. In 1959, Guess received his law degree from University of Virginia School of Law. He worked as an attorney for the United States Department of the Interior and settled in Anchorage, Alaska. He then practiced law in Anchorage. From 1965 to 1973, Guess served in the Alaska House of Representatives and was a Democrat. He served as speaker of the house in 1971. In 1972 and 1974, Guess campaigned for the United States Senate and lost the elections. Guess died of an aneurysm at the Baranof Hotel in Juneau, Alaska while on a business trip. His daughter Gretchen Guess also served in the Alaska Legislature.

Notes

|-

1932 births
1975 deaths
Alaska lawyers
College of William & Mary alumni
Lawyers from Alexandria, Virginia
Lawyers from Anchorage, Alaska
Military personnel from Anchorage, Alaska
Military personnel from Mississippi
People from Tutwiler, Mississippi
Politicians from Alexandria, Virginia
Politicians from Anchorage, Alaska
Speakers of the Alaska House of Representatives
Democratic Party members of the Alaska House of Representatives
United States Department of the Interior officials
University of Virginia School of Law alumni
20th-century American politicians